This page shows the results of the Bowling Competition for men and women at the 1991 Pan American Games, held from August 2 to August 18, 1991 in Havana, Cuba. The event was included for the first time at the Pan American Games.

Having been held at the Games as a demonstration sport in 1983, the sport was given full status by the Pan American Sports Organization Council in 1986. The 1991 edition represented the first time that athletes' performances counted towards the Pan American Games medal table.

Men's competition

Masters

Teams

Women's competition

Masters

Teams

Medal table

References
 Sports 123
 bowlingdigital

Events at the 1991 Pan American Games
1991
1991 in bowling